Toshi in Takarazuka – Love Forever  is a 1983 Japanese dance and musical film directed by Umetsugu Inoue, presenting Toshihiko Tahara, a singer then noted for his abilities as a dancer, with a large supporting cast of singers and dancers – mainly drawn from the roster of the Johnny & Associates talent agency of Johnny Kitagawa. The film was shot in the Tokyo Takarazuka Theatre Tokyo and Yurakucho on January 29–30.

Cast
Toshihiko Tahara
Shonentai members Kazukiyo (ja), Noriyuki Higashiyama and Uekusa Katsuhide (ja)
Yoshiyuki (ja)
Matsubara Hideki (ja)
Soga Yasuhisa (ja)
Eagles (ja) teen boy band of Johnny & Associates (members Nakamura Nariyuki ja Uji Masataka ja Utsumi Koji ja Osawa Mikio ja)
Johnny's Jr.
Murata Katsumi & Kuesuchonzu
Nagura Dancing team
Nomura Yoshio (ja) 
Masahiko Kondō

References

1983 films
Nikkatsu films
Japanese musical films
1980s musical films
Films directed by Umetsugu Inoue
1980s Japanese films